Gabriele Piccinini (born 6 April 2001) is an Italian football player. He plays for  club Fiorenzuola on loan from Pisa.

Club career
He spent the first three seasons of his senior career in the fourth-tier Serie D.

On 15 July 2021, he signed a three-year contract with Serie B club Pisa.

He made his Serie B debut for Pisa on 22 August 2021 against SPAL. On 31 January 2022, Piccinini was loaned to Fiorenzuola. On 7 January 2023, he was loaned to Fiorenzuola once more.

Personal life
His younger brother Stefano Piccinini is also a football player.

References

External links
 

2001 births
21st-century Italian people
People from Scandiano
Sportspeople from the Province of Reggio Emilia
Footballers from Emilia-Romagna
Living people
Italian footballers
Association football forwards
A.C. Reggiana 1919 players
Pisa S.C. players
U.S. Fiorenzuola 1922 S.S. players
Serie D players
Serie B players
Serie C players